Brunswick is a civil parish in the northeastern corner of Queens County, New Brunswick, Canada.

For governance purposes it formed (before 2023) the local service district of the parish of Brunswick, which was a member of Regional Service Commission 8 (RSC8).

Origin of name
The parish was probably named in honour of the Duke of Brunswick, German military leader against Napoleon, killed at the Battle of Quatre-Bras the year before the parish's erection.

History
In 1786 New Brunswick chose to set up the province's system of counties and parishes as first Act of the legislation, replacing the counties established the year before through a series of Letters Patent and the township system that was inherited from Nova Scotia in 1784. The eastern boundary of Queens County passed approximately through Coles Island and the Gaspereau Forks on the Salmon River but the rear lines of Waterborough and Wickham Parishes ran approximately through Hunters Home and Chipman, extending into Westmorland and Northumberland Counties.

In 1816 this unassigned area was erected as Brunswick Parish; because the county line hadn't been surveyed yet, any inhabitants of the New Canaan settlement were to belong to Brunswick Parish.

In 1835 part of Brunswick was included in the newly erected Chipman Parish.

Boundaries
Brunswick Parish is bounded:

 on the northeast east by the Kent County line;
 on the east by the Westmorland County line;
 on the southeast by the Kings County line;
 on the west by a line running north-northwesterly from north of the end of Chittick Road in Marrtown, crossing the Canaan River east of Phillips Brook and striking the Waterborough Parish line about 2 kilometres northwest of Parks Lake;
 on the northwest by a line running north 54º east from a point on the Saint John River about 1.8 kilometres southwest of the Route 715 bridge over McAlpines Brook.

Communities
Communities at least partly within the parish. bold indicates an incorporated municipality

 Alward
 Brookvale
  Canaan Forks
 Cherryvale

 Forks Stream
 Hunters Home
 New Canaan

Bodies of water
Bodies of water at least partly within the parish.

  Canaan River
 Forks Stream
 Long Creek
 Cranberry Lake

 Lake Stream Lake
 Lower Lake
 Parks Lake
 Snowshoe Lake

Other notable places
Parks, historic sites, and other noteworthy places at least partly within the parish.
 Brookvale Protected Natural Area
 Canaan Bog Protected Natural Area
 Cranberry Lake Protected Natural Area

Demographics
Revised census figures based on the 2023 local governance reforms have not been released.

Population
Population trend

Language
Mother tongue (2016)

Access Routes
Highways and numbered routes that run through the parish, including external routes that start or finish at the parish limits:

Highways

Principal Routes

Secondary Routes:
None

External Routes:
None

See also
List of parishes in New Brunswick

Notes

References

Parishes of Queens County, New Brunswick
Local service districts of Queens County, New Brunswick